The SS City of Manchester was an iron-hulled single screw liner built 1851 by Tod & McGregor, Glasgow, Scotland and the second such ship owned by the Inman Line (officially the Liverpool and Philadelphia Steam Ship Company). It was an improved version of their first ship City of Glasgow which had been launched a year earlier.

Steerage passengers were carried beginning in 1852. The City of Manchester was chartered to the French government during the Crimean War, and resumed Inman voyages in 1856. She departed London for Calcutta 24 August 1857 as a transport as a result of the Indian Mutiny. By the next year, New York replaced Philadelphia as the American destination. After 20 years of Inman service, the City of Manchester was sold and converted to sail. She was wrecked near Akyab, Burma in November 1876.

References

References cited

Steamships of the United Kingdom
1851 ships
Maritime incidents in September 1851
Maritime incidents in November 1876
Ships built in Glasgow
Merchant ships of the United Kingdom
Maritime incidents in October 1853